Gharrafat Al Rayyan is a district of Al Rayyan City in Qatar, located in the municipality of Al Rayyan.

Etymology
"Gharrafat" is derived from the Arabic word meaning "to scoop up". This name was earned due to the area's low elevation, allowing it to act as a floodplain from whence locals would collect water in the past. The second part of its name originates from the city of Al Rayyan, which translates to "irrigation"; it was given this name because it constitutes a part of the city.

Infrastructure
The district houses the Qatar Science & Technology Park, the Qatar National Convention Centre, Education City community housing and other facilities of Qatar Foundation. North-east of the district is Al Gharrafa, which hosts the Sidra Medical and Research Center. To the south is the district of Al Shagub, which accommodates other facilities of Qatar Foundation's, such as Education City's universities.

Gharrafat Al Rayyan Health Center services the district as well as the southern villages and towns in Umm Salal and Al Daayen.

The Ministry of Interior's General Directorate of Civil Defence is nestled in the district.

Gallery

References

Populated places in Al Rayyan